Ramonda spathulata is a species of fly in the family Tachinidae.

Distribution
Andorra, Austria, Belgium, Bulgaria, Croatia, Czech Republic, Denmark, Finland, France, Germany,  Hungary, Italy, Netherlands, Norway, Poland, Portugal, Russia, Slovakia, Spain, Sweden, Switzerland, Ukraine, U.K.

References

Dexiinae
Diptera of Europe
Taxa named by Carl Fredrik Fallén
Insects described in 1820